Aglyptodactylus laticeps is a species of frog in the family Mantellidae.
It is endemic to Madagascar.
Its natural habitats are subtropical or tropical dry forests and intermittent freshwater marshes.
It is threatened by habitat loss.

References

Aglyptodactylus
Endemic frogs of Madagascar
Taxonomy articles created by Polbot
Amphibians described in 1998